Megacheilacris is a genus of grasshopper, in the tribe Taeniophorini, found in Central and South America.

Species
The Orthoptera Species File lists:
Megacheilacris bullifemur Descamps & Amédégnato, 1971- type species (as  Megacephalacris bullifemur = M. bullifemur bullifemur)
Megacheilacris graminicola Descamps & Amédégnato, 1971
Megacheilacris megacephala Bruner, 1907
Megacheilacris vallensis (Descamps & Amédégnato, 1971)

References 

Caelifera genera
Romaleidae